The Equestrian Competition at the 2005 Mediterranean Games was held in the Almería Equestrian Club  in Almería, Spain.

Men's competition

Individual Jumping

Team Jumping

Medal table

References
Results

Sports at the 2005 Mediterranean Games
2005
Equestrian sports competitions in Spain
2005 in equestrian